Paisa Paisa is a 2013 Indian Malayalam thriller film written and directed by debutante director Prasanth Murali. The film was produced by Raj Zacharias under the banner Celebs and Red Carpet and features Indrajith, Aju Varghese, Mamta Mohandas, Sandhya and Daniel Balaji in the lead roles. Set against the backdrop of Chennai and Kochi, Paisa Paisa is a multi-narrative realistic thriller showing how money can affect the lives of people. The film released on 28 June 2013. The songs were composed by debutant, Aby Salvin while Rahul Raj composed the background score.

Plot
The story unfolds the events happening in just four hours of a day in two cities - Kochi and Chennai. Balu who goes to Chennai to attend an interview falls into a trap in the few minutes he goes out of the call centre office to make a phone call. He contacts his friend Kishore, an ad filmmaker and his friend, to help him with some money. Kishore, who is in Kochi, has an equally crucial day. His wife Surya is returning to his life as the couple has been living separate for some time. Kishore sets aside his plans to reconcile with his wife to help his friend. However, he fails to gather enough money to help Balu. How money changes the life of these characters forms the rest of the story.

Cast
 Indrajith Sukumaran as Kishore
 Aju Varghese as Balu
 Daniel Balaji as Auto driver who kidnap Balu
 Mamta Mohandas as Surya
 Sandhya as Kumudam, auto driver's wife
 Apoorva Bose as Pooja
 Kishore Satya as Aby Pothen
 Rajeev Rangan as Rajeev
 Anoop Chandran as Venkidesh
 Dileesh Pothan as Omanakuttan
 Dinesh Paniker as Bhaskaran
 Aneesh G Menon as Sandheep
 Sasi Kalinga as Aalikka

Production
Directed by debutante Prasanth Murali, an erstwhile assistant to V. K. Prakash, the script for the flick was jointly penned by the director and Rajesh Varma. Model-turned-actress Amruta Patki featured in the promotional song of this film. The shooting of the film started at Chennai in November 2012.

Soundtrack

The soundtrack of Paisa Paisa consists of 7 songs, out of which 6 songs were composed by Aby Salvin Thomas while the theme song was composed by Rahul Raj. D. Santhosh wrote the lyrics of all songs.

Critical reception

The Times of India gave the film a rating of 2.5 out of 5 saying that, "Paisa Paisa loses its pace for want of engaging twists and a taut narrative and easily turns into a flick that passes by without a flutter." Paresh C Palicha of Rediff gave the film a rating of 2 out of 5 and said that, "Paisa Paisa has a promising premise to build on, but turns out to be a disappointment."

References

External links
 

2013 films
2010s Malayalam-language films
2013 thriller films
Indian thriller films